The flood of Doubs river was the biggest flooding in the history of the Doubs river (France); the water rose up to nearly 10 metres above the usual level, January 21, 1910. The principal departements affected were the département of Doubs, the département of Jura and also the département of Saône et Loire. At least one person was killed, and many others may have been killed because of this flood.

Causes 
In the beginning of 1910, a lot of floods damaged France: the flood of Seine river in Île-de-France, in Chambéry, Troyes, Morez and lot of other French cities were affected and the ports of Marseille and Toulon where decimates by an historical tempest.

In Franche-Comté, the most probable causes of this flood where a heavy rainfall in the region since the previous month; the ground could not retain more water. Another cause accentuated the situation: the snow melted because the temperature was exceptionally warm.

Cities and villages affected 
The following list includes cities and villages officially damaged by the flood of the Doubs. The flood affected 112 cities or villages in Doubs, 33 in Jura, and 20 in Saône-et-Loire, so a total of 154 localities.

Municipalities of Doubs

 Abbans-Dessous
 Appenans
 Arbouans
 Arçon
 Audincourt
 Avanne-Aveney
 Bart
 Baume-les-Dames
 Bavans
 Berche
 Besançon
 Beure
 Bief
 Blussangeaux
 Blussans
 Bonnétage
 Bourguignon
 Boussières
 Branne
 Byans-sur-Doubs
 Chalèze
 Chalezeule
 Champlive
 Charmauvillers
 Charquemont
 Chaux-lès-Clerval
 Clerval
 Colombier-Fontaine
 Courcelles-lès-Montbéliard
 Dampierre-sur-le-Doubs
 Dampjoux
 Deluz
 Doubs
 Esnans
 Étouvans
 Fessevillers
 Fourbanne
 Fourcatier-et-Maison-Neuve
 Fournet-Blancheroche
 Gellin
 Glère
 Goumois
 Grand'Combe-Châteleu
 Grand'Combe-des-Bois
 Grandfontaine
 Hauterive-la-Fresse
 Hyèvre-Magny
 Hyèvre-Paroisse
 Indevillers
 Labergement-Sainte-Marie
 Laissey
 La Cluse-et-Mijoux
 La Longeville
 La Prétière
 Les Combes
 Les Fins
 Les Grangettes
 Les Villedieu
 Liebvillers
 L'Isle-sur-le-Doubs
 Longevelle-sur-Doubs
 Longevilles-Mont-d'Or
 Lougres
 Maisons-du-Bois-Lièvremont
 Malbuisson
 Mancenans
 Mandeure
 Mathay
 Médière
 Montancy
 Morteau
 Montbenoît
 Montfaucon
 Montferrand-le-Château
 Mouthe
 Montjoie-le-Château
 Montlebon
 Montperreux
 Noirefontaine
 Novillars
 Osselle
 Ougney-Douvot
 Oye-et-Pallet
 Pompierre-sur-Doubs
 Pont-de-Roide
 Rancenay
 Rang
 Roche-lès-Clerval
 Rochejean
 Roche-lez-Beaupré
 Roset-Fluans
 Routelle
 Saint-Georges-Armont
 Saint-Hippolyte
 Saint-Maurice-Colombier
 Saint-Point-Lac
 Saint-Vit
 Santoche
 Sarrageois
 Soulce-Cernay
 Thise
 Thoraise
 Torpes
 Vaire-Arcier
 Vaire-le-Petit
 Valentigney
 Vaufrey
 Villars-Saint-Georges
 Villars-sous-Dampjoux
 Ville-du-Pont
 Villers-le-Lac
 Voujeaucourt

Municipalities of Jura

 Annoire
 Asnans-Beauvoisin
 Audelange
 Baverans
 Brevans
 Champdivers
 Chaussin
 Chemin
 Choisey
 Crissey
 Dampierre
 Dole
 Éclans-Nenon
 Étrepigney
 Évans
 Falletans
 Fraisans
 Gevry
 Lavans-lès-Dole
 La Barre
 Longwy-sur-le-Doubs
 Molay
 Neublans-Abergement
 Orchamps
 Parcey
 Peseux
 Petit-Noir
 Rahon
 Ranchot
 Rans
 Rochefort-sur-Nenon
 Salans
 Villette-lès-Dole

Municipalities of Saône-et-Loire

 Authumes
 Charette
 Charnay-lès-Chalon
 Ciel
 Clux
 Fretterans
 Frontenard
 La Villeneuve
 Lays-sur-le-Doubs
 Les Bordes
 Longepierre
 Mont-lès-Seurre
 Navilly
 Pierre-de-Bresse
 Pontoux
 Pourlans
 Saunières
 Sermesse
 Varenne-sur-le-Doubs
 Verdun-sur-le-Doubs

The flood in Besançon 
The city of Besançon was flooded in the old center and in the area of Battant. On January 18, 1910, the water rose to nearly 7 meters above the usual level, and 8.68 meters on January 20, 1910. The inhabitants were deprived of electricity and gas, and all bridges were closed. On January 21, 1910, the Doubs river reached 9.57 meters, nearly the usual level. The city was ravaged by this flood, but there were no fatalities in the city.

See also 
 Flood

1910 in France
History of Franche-Comté